Keeping You a Secret is a young adult novel by Julie Anne Peters. It was first published in hardback in 2003, and later in paperback in 2005.  This novel deals with mature themes. It is about a young girl (Holland, aged 17) discovering her sexuality and what it is like to experience homophobia. What starts out as a confusing "girl crush" becomes a discovery of Holland's true feelings and coping with the concept of attraction to a member of her own sex. Other characters in the novel discover her crush and employ various means of physical and emotional abuse and violence, displaying strong homophobic behaviors.

See also

Lesbian teen fiction

References

2003 American novels
American LGBT novels
American young adult novels
Novels with lesbian themes
2000s LGBT novels
Lesbian teen fiction
Little, Brown and Company books
LGBT-related young adult novels
2003 LGBT-related literary works